Copa América is a South American men's football competition.

Copa America may also refer to:
Copa América Femenina, a women's competition
Copa América de Futsal, a futsal competition
Copa America (indoor), an indoor football competition
Copa America de Beisbol, an international baseball competition, see 2008 America Cup (Baseball)
CSP Copa America, or Rink Hockey American Championship, an international rink hockey competition

See also
America's Cup (disambiguation)